Eduardo "Lalo" Sardiñas was a combatant of Cuban Revolution, and a member of the 26th of July Movement, led by Fidel Castro during 1958 and 1959.

Biography 
Eduardo "Lalo" Sardiñas was a merchant who worked in the Sierra Maestra area in the 1950s. In 1957 he joined Fidel Castro's newly established guerrilla group after killing a stranger who had entered his home.

When the Second Column (the so-called Fourth Column) was created under the command of Che Guevara, he appointed Lalo as his second in command, with the rank of captain. In various fights and skirmishes he demonstrated courage and intelligence.

In September 1957, Sardinas decided to punish one of his men for a breach of discipline. He tried to hit him in the head with his pistol, but he, accidentally, shot the man and killed him on the spot. The event produced a general reaction from the guerrillas demanding that Sardiñas be shot. Che Guevara and Fidel Castro had a different opinion than that of the majority of the rebel army. They tried, for a whole day, to convince their men that shooting Sardiñas was an excessive punishment. Finally, a conflictive vote was held among all the members of the rebel army in which for a small difference, it was decided to downgrade but not shoot. Seventy-six guerrillas voted for degradation of the punishment, while seventy voted for death.

As a result of the trial, Lalo Sardiñas lost his position and was replaced by Camilo Cienfuegos as Second Commander of Che Guevara in the Fourth Column. Later, in June 1958, Lalo Sardiñas, now with the rank of lieutenant and in command of a twenty-three-man battalion, played a key role in stopping the government's military offensive on the guerrilla positions in Sierra Maestra; a fact that would later enable the counteroffensive that would finally lead to the fall of the dictator Fulgencio Batista.

A few weeks later, when the guerrillas decided to go down and begin the march on Santa Clara, Sardiñas was promoted to commander and was placed in command of Column No. 12 Simón Bolívar. In that role he again played an important role in preventing government troops from surrounding the columns of Camilo Cienfuegos and Che Guevara that advanced towards the Escambray on the border between Camagüey and Oriente.

Finally, the day before Batista's escape, on December 30, 1958, Sardiñas and his men took the city of Jobabo for good.

See also 
Cuban Revolution

References

External links 
 Un episodio desagradable, relato de Ernesto Guevara sobre el juicio a Lalo Sardiñas, publicado originalmente en la revista Verde Olivo, el 28 de abril de 1963, Centro de Estudios Che Guevara

1950s in Cuba
20th century in Cuba
Military history of Cuba
Republic of Cuba (1902–1959)
Cuban rebels
Year of birth missing
Year of death missing